Larráinzar may refer to:

In people
 Domingo Larrainzar (born 1969), Spanish former footballer
 Iñigo Larrainzar (born 1971), Spanish retired footballer
 Manuel Larráinzar (1809-1884), Mexican conservative politician
 María Ernestina Larráinzar Córdoba (1854-1925), Italian-born Mexican writer, teacher, religious order founder
 Oier Larraínzar (born 1977), Spanish retired footballer

In places
 Larráinzar, municipality of Chiapas, in southern Mexico
 San Andrés Larráinzar, town in the Mexican state of Chiapas